Pre-installed iOS apps, referred to in the App Store as 'Built-In Apps', are a suite of mobile applications developed by Apple Inc. which are bundled with iOS and installed by default or through a system update. Many of the default apps found on iOS have counterparts on Apple's other operating systems macOS, iPadOS, watchOS, and tvOS, which are often modified versions of or similar to the iOS application. As each app is integrated into the operating system itself, they often feature greater support for system features than third-party alternatives and are quick to adapt new features of iOS.

Apple has also included versions of iWork, iMovie, and GarageBand for free with new device activations since the release of iOS 7; however, these apps are maintained independently from the operating system, with updates instead released through the App Store.

Since iOS 10, most pre-installed apps have been removable. With iOS 14 or later, as well as iPadOS 15 or later, users can hide pre-installed apps in the newly introduced App Library, as well as change their default web browser and email client to a third-party alternative.

Applications

App Store 

The App Store is a digital distribution platform which allows users to browse and download apps developed with Apple's iOS Software Development Kit. The App Store opened on July 10, 2008, with an initial 500 applications available. The number of apps peaked at around 2.2 million in 2017, but declined slightly over the next few years as Apple began a process to remove old apps or 32-bit apps that do not function as intended or that don't follow current app guidelines. As of 2020, the store features around 1.8 million apps. On September 19, 2019, Apple Arcade, a gaming subscription service that provides unlimited access to a catalogue of games for a monthly fee, was released through a dedicated tab on the App Store.

Books 

Books, formerly iBooks, is an e-book reading and store app released in mid-2010, as part of the iOS 4 update. Initially, iBooks was not pre-loaded onto iOS devices, but users could install it free of charge from the App Store. With the release of iOS 8, it became an integrated app. It primarily receives EPUB content from the Apple Books store, but users can also add their own EPUB and Portable Document Format (PDF) files via data synchronization with iTunes. Additionally, the files can be downloaded to Apple Books through Safari or Apple Mail. It is also capable of displaying e-books that incorporate multimedia. Books has also expanded to allow the purchase and listening of audiobooks through the app. Reading goals can be set which encourage users to read for an amount of time each day.

Calculator 

Calculator is a basic calculator app introduced with the initial launch of the iPhone and iPhone OS 1 in 2007. The standard mode includes a number pad, buttons for adding, subtracting, multiplying, and dividing.  A scientific calculator can be accessed by rotating the device landscape, which supports exponents and trigonometric functions.

Calendar 

Calendar is a personal calendar app introduced with the initial launch of the iPhone and iPhone OS 1 in 2007. It tracks events and appointments added by the user and includes various holidays depending on the location the phone is set to as well as birthdays from contacts. Users are also able to subscribe to other calendars from friends or third-parties. Since iOS 5, Calendar supports online cloud backup of calendars using Apple's iCloud service, or synchronization with other calendar services, including Google Calendar and Microsoft Exchange Server.

Camera 
Camera is a photo taking app introduced with the initial launch of the iPhone and iPhone OS 1 in 2007. Photos can be taken with flash or with filters applied, as well as a timer option which will take a photo after three seconds have passed since hitting the capture button. The ability to record video footage was introduced in iPhone OS 3 and has since been updated so that videos can be filmed in time-lapse or slow motion. On the iPhone 7 Plus and above, photos can be taken in 'portrait mode', which creates a depth effect so that the subject is in focus while the background is blurred. The camera is also capable of creating panoramic images. On iPhone 11, iPhone 11 Pro, and iPhone SE (2nd generation) with iOS 13 or iPhone XR or later on iOS 14 or later, the camera app was redesigned with a new font and a new UI for controls.

Clock 

Clock is a timekeeping app introduced with the initial launch of the iPhone and iPhone OS 1 in 2007. It allows users to view the current time in locations around the world, set alarms and timers, and use their phone as a stopwatch. Alarms and timers will play a chime once completed, which the user can choose from their ringtone library. A bedtime feature was introduced in iOS 10, which acts as a special alarm in which the user sets both a time they would like to go to bed and a time they would like to wake up. A notification is sent to the user before their set bedtime and the phone is automatically placed into Do Not Disturb mode until morning.

Compass 
Compass is a simple navigation app introduced with iPhone OS 3 on June 17, 2009. It displays the user's direction on a compass rose, as well as their current geographical coordinates, location, and altitude.

Contacts 

Contacts is an address book app that was first included as part of the Phone app with the launch of the iPhone in 2007 but was split off into a standalone application with the release of iPhone OS 2. Contacts can be synchronised over iCloud and other online address book services and allows for the storage of names, phone numbers, email addresses, home addresses, job titles, birthdays, and social media usernames.

FaceTime 

FaceTime is a videotelephony app available on supported iOS devices running iOS 4 and later which allows for video calls between participants using the front-facing camera of their device. FaceTime Audio, an audio-only version, is available on any iOS device that supports iOS 7 or newer. In 2018, Apple added group video and audio support to FaceTime which can support up to 32 people alongside the release of iOS 12. With iOS 15, users are able to share and watch music and video content together over FaceTime with SharePlay.

Files 

Files is a file management app for devices that run iOS 11 and later. Files allows users to browse local files stored within apps, as well as files stored in cloud storage services, including iCloud, Dropbox, Google Drive, and OneDrive. It allows for the saving, opening and organization of files, including placement into structured folders and sub-folders. Further organization can be done through the use of color-coded or custom-named tags, and a persistent search bar allows for finding files inside folders, though not inside other apps. A list view enables different sorting options. The app offers the exclusive playback of high-quality FLAC audio files, and also offers support for viewing text files, images, and ZIP archives, as well as limited support for video.

Find My 

Find My is an app and service that enables users to track the locations of iOS, iPadOS, macOS, watchOS, AirPods and AirTags. The app was first released with iOS 13 on September 19, 2019, and combines both the Find My iPhone and Find My Friends apps. Missing devices can be made to play a sound at maximum volume, flagged as lost and locked with a passcode, or remotely erased. Users are also able to share their GPS locations with friends and family who own Apple devices of their own and can set notifications for when a person arrives or leaves a destination.

Fitness 

Fitness, formerly Activity, is an exercise tracking companion app available on iPhones running iOS 8.2 or above for users with a connected Apple Watch, or on any device running iOS 16. The app displays a summary view of user's recorded workouts from the Apple Watch or supported third-party apps and exercise equipment. Workouts in the fitness app show relevant metrics, such as heart rate, depending on the type of exercise and after a 180-day period, the app will also begin to show users their exercise trends averaged over the present and past rolling 90-day windows. 

On December 14, 2020, Apple Fitness+, a guided workout video streaming service, was made available through the Fitness app.

Freeform 

Freeform is a virtual brainstorming app first made available on December 13, 2022, alongside iOS 16.2. It allows users to create canvases called "boards", which can display a range of inputs including text notes, photos, documents, and web links. There are also a variety of pen and brush tools available on the iOS and iPadOS versions of the software, letting users add sketches or handwriting to their boards similar to the tools available in the Notes app, which are compatible with the Apple Pencil. The app offers real-time collaboration between users, with support for FaceTime and iCloud syncing.

Health 

Health is a health informatics app announced on June 2, 2014 available on iPhones running iOS 8 or later. The app stores and tracks user's health data and clinical medical records, and can be connected to various hardware devices and third party apps. It also offers a profile called "Medical ID" that provides easy access to important medical information for first responders. In 2018, "Health Records" were introduced, which allowed users on iOS 11.3 or later to import their medical records from their doctor or hospital. As of 2020, the types of data stored by the Health app include steps, walking and running distance, flights climbed, heart rate, nutrition, sleep analysis, heart rate variability, cycle tracking, and weight.

Home 

Home is a smart-home management app released on September 13, 2016, along with iOS 10 that lets users configure, communicate with, and control their HomeKit enabled smart appliances from a single application. It supports automations using a home hub, and pre-programmed "Scenes", which can set multiple devices using a single command. Appliances can be divided into separate rooms and access to home controls can be shared with others. HomePod devices are also updated through the home app.

iTunes Store 

The iTunes Store is a digital media store operated by Apple Inc. that opened on April 28, 2003, as a result of Steve Jobs' push to open a digital marketplace for music. The iTunes Store was first made available on iOS devices with the release of iPhone OS 2, allowing the purchase of music and podcasts. iPhone OS 3 further added the ability to rent and purchase movies and tv shows from the iTunes Store. As of April 2020, iTunes offers 60 million songs, 2.2 million apps, 25,000 TV shows, and 65,000 films. When it opened, it was the only legal digital catalog of music to offer songs from all five major record labels. As of June 2013, the iTunes Store possessed 575 million active user accounts, and served over 315 million mobile devices.

Magnifier 
Magnifier is a digital magnifying glass, available as both an accessibility shortcut and as a standalone application in later versions of iOS. It uses the device's camera to allow users to zoom in on information in front of them, as well as take a freeze frame which can be saved as an image similar to the Camera app. A range of colour filters can be applied for easier viewing, and the brightness and contrast of the image can be manually adjusted. With the release of the iPhone 12, the Magnifier app has included the ability to detect people and doors for those with vision impairments through the device's lidar sensors.

Mail 

Mail is an email client introduced with the initial launch of the iPhone and iPhone OS 1 in 2007. It is preconfigured to work with popular email providers, such as Yahoo! Mail, AOL Mail, Gmail, Outlook and iCloud (formerly MobileMe) and supports Exchange. Mail includes the ability to read and write emails, file emails into folders, search for emails, automatically append signatures to outgoing emails, and automatically unsubscribe from newsletters. Rich text formatting was introduced to Apple Mail with the release of iOS 5.

Maps 

Maps is a web mapping app and service introduced with the initial launch of the iPhone and iPhone OS 1 in 2007. It provides turn-by-turn directions and estimated times of arrival for automobile, pedestrian, cycling and public transportation navigation. Indoor maps for airports and large shopping malls was introduced to Maps with the release of iOS 11. Apple Maps also features Flyover mode, a feature that enables a user to explore certain densely populated urban centers and other places of interest in a 3D landscape composed of models of buildings and structures. Look Around, which allows the user to view 360° street-level imagery, was introduced and released alongside iOS 13.

Initially, Maps used data from Google Maps until Apple released their own service on September 19, 2012.

Measure 

Measure is an augmented reality measurement app available on devices running iOS 12 and above. Using Apple's ARKit, it allows users to measure objects by pointing the device's camera at them. It is capable of measuring in both metric and imperial units and moving the camera closer to an object will display a ruler view which divides measurements into centimetres or inches, respectively. The app also allows for an iPhone to be used as a level; a feature previously available in the Compass app.

Messages 

Messages is an instant messaging app introduced with iPhone OS 3 on June 17, 2009, that replaced the older Text app. The app supports SMS, MMS, and iMessage with the bubble of messages sent via SMS appearing green and messages sent over iMessage appearing blue. iOS 10 introduced a number of upgrades to the iMessage platform, including message effects and a dedicated iMessage App Store which allows users to download sticker packs that can be sent in conversations. iOS 16 introduced the ability to edit or delete messages within a fifteen minute window after being sent.

Music 

Music is a media player first introduced with iOS 5 on October 12, 2011, replacing the iPod app. It can play music files stored locally on devices and allows users to curate their song library into playlists. Songs can be purchased directly from the iTunes Store or streamed through Apple Music if the user has an active subscription. Internet radio stations can also be found within the app, with both local and international broadcasters available. Music supports lossless and spatial audio, and is capable of video playback, used primarily for music videos, artist interviews, and live performances.

News 

News is a news aggregator available for devices running iOS 9 or above. It is the successor to the Newsstand app included in previous versions of iOS. Users can read news articles with it, based on publishers, websites and topics they select, such as technology or politics. On March 25, 2019, Apple News+ was made available within the News app, which is a subscription service allowing access to content from a number magazines and newspapers. On July 15, 2020, Apple announced the addition of audio stories in Apple News+, which allows subscribers to listen to narrated versions of articles in a similar fashion to a podcast under a new Audio tab.

Notes 

Notes is a notetaking app introduced with the initial launch of the iPhone and iPhone OS 1 in 2007. It functions as a service for making text notes and sketches, which can be synchronised between devices using Apple's iCloud service. With the release of iOS 9, advanced text formatting options, several styles of lists, rich web and map link previews, support for more file type attachments, a corresponding dedicated attachment browser, and a system share extension point for saving web links, images, and more were added to the Notes app. Since iOS 11, Notes has included a document scanner feature.

Phone 
Phone is an app introduced with the initial launch of the iPhone and iPhone OS 1 in 2007. One of the key features of the original iPhone, the app allows users to make and receive phone calls, view their call history, and access their voicemail. The device's address book can also be accessed from within the Phone app, even if the Contacts app is uninstalled.

Photos 

Photos is a photo management and editing app introduced with initial launch of the iPhone and iPhone OS 1 in 2007 and rebuilt from the ground up with iOS 8. Photos are organized by "moments", which are a combination of time and location metadata attached to the photo. Photos can be synced and backed up through the iCloud Photo Library and shared albums. Photos contains a number of simple editing tools which allow users to crop, rotate, and adjust their photos, with a limited number of editing tools available for videos.

Podcasts 

Podcasts is a media player app used for playing podcasts from the iTunes Store available for users running iOS 6 or above, after previously being available through the Music app. Podcasts can be discovered and followed or subscribed to in the 'Browse' and 'Search' tabs, with the 'Listen Now’ tab showing new episodes of followed podcasts as they are made available. Podcast channels allow users to follow or subscribe to creators rather than individual shows.

Reminders 

Reminders is a task management app first introduced with the release of iOS 5 and rebuilt from the ground up in iOS 13. The app allows users to create their own lists of reminders and set notifications for themselves. New reminders can be placed into lists or set as subtasks and can include several details including: a priority tag, a note about the reminder, and an image or URL attachment. Additionally, alarms can be set for reminders, sending a notification to users at a certain time and date, when a geofence around an area is crossed, or when a message starts being typed to a set contact. If a time-based alert is set, it can repeat every day, week, two weeks, month, or year. Lists can be synced through iCloud and shared with other contacts.

Safari 

Safari is a graphical web browser based on the WebKit engine bundled with iOS devices since the iPhone's introduction in 2007. Websites can be bookmarked, added to a reading list, or saved to the home screen and are synced between devices through iCloud. With iOS 13, Safari was updated with a download manager which allows users to save files from the web onto their phone's local storage. Safari received a significant redesign in iOS 15, including a new landing page and support for browser extensions from the App Store.

Settings 
Settings is an app available since initial launch of the iPhone in 2007. Settings allows users to access information about their device and change the settings and options on their phone such as the device wallpaper, notifications, Wi-Fi and Bluetooth, display and brightness, Siri and more. A user's Apple ID and iCloud accounts are also managed from within the settings app, as well as third-party account details through the built-in password manager. With the release of iOS 12, a Screen Time feature was introduced which is intended to help user's focus and combat smartphone addiction.

Shortcuts 

Shortcuts, formerly Workflow, is a block-based visual scripting app. Workflow was acquired by Apple in 2017 and became a default app with the release of iOS 13. The app allows users to create macros for executing specific tasks on their device. These task sequences can be created by the user and shared online through iCloud. A number of curated shortcuts can also be downloaded from the integrated gallery.

Stocks 
Stocks is a stock market tracking app introduced with the initial launch of the iPhone and iPhone OS 1 in 2007. It allows users to check the Yahoo! Finance data for any company valued on the stock exchange, including the current value of a company and their increase or decrease percentage. A graph shows the trends of each company over time, with a green graph showing positive growth and a red graph showing a decline. Business News is provided at the bottom of the app, which shows Apple News articles about companies a user is following.

Tips 
Tips is an app introduced with iOS 8 which provides tips and tricks for users to get the most out of their device. Tips are added alongside new iOS releases to show users what's new on their devices and sorted into categories such as "Essentials" and "Genius Picks".

Translate 

Translate is a translation app released on September 16, 2020, alongside iOS 14. It functions as a service for translating text sentences or speech between several languages. All translations are processed through the device's neural engine, and as such can be used offline. Translation is currently supported between English (both British and American dialects), Arabic, Mandarin Chinese, French, German, Spanish, Italian, Japanese, Korean, the Brazilian dialect of Portuguese and Russian.

TV 

TV, also known as Apple TV and formerly Videos, is a media player app used for viewing television shows and films purchased or rented through the iTunes Store, which can be accessed from within the app. It also houses original content from the Apple TV+ streaming service, and can even directly stream content from some third-party services through the a la carte video on demand "Apple TV Channels" service. The TV app can be used to index and access content from other linked video on demand services, allowing programs watched in other apps to appear in a user's Up Next feed, even if they are not subscribed through the Channels service. The TV app is also capable of broadcasting live sports and events, such as through the MLS Season Pass.

Voice Memos 
Voice Memos is a voice recording app introduced with the release of iPhone OS 3 designed for saving short snippets of audio for later playback. Saved voice memos can be shared as a .m4a file or can be edited, which allows parts of a recording to be replaced, background noise to be removed, or the length of a recording to be trimmed. Other playback options include the ability to change playback speed, skip silent parts of a memo, or enhance a recording. Audio files can also be organised into different folders.

Wallet 

Wallet, formerly Passbook, is a digital wallet included with iOS 6 and above that allows users to store Wallet-passes, meaning coupons, boarding passes, student ID cards, event tickets, movie tickets, public transportation tickets, retail store cards, and – starting with iOS 8.1 – credit cards, debit cards, prepaid cards, and loyalty cards via Apple Pay. Apple has since expanded Wallet even further, introducing support for car keys with supported manufacturers, house keys for smart lock devices, hotel room keys, and driver's licenses in some US states. Unlike their physical counterparts, cards stored in Wallet are able to display additional information that updates over time, such as transaction histories or point balances for loyalty cards. Since iOS 16, users can also track progress on deliveries and orders as well as view receipts through Wallet.

Wallet also acts as the main interface for Apple Card, Apple's credit card service.

Watch 
Watch allows users to set-up and pair their Apple Watch devices to their iPhones, as well as customize settings, watch faces, and loaded apps. The face gallery displays options for available watch faces, giving users the option to change preferences and complications from their phones rather than directly on the watch, with the ability to share custom layouts with others. The Discover tab highlights compatible and recommended apps from the App Store and shows users tips on how to get the most from their device.

Weather 

Weather is a weather forecasting app introduced with the initial launch of the iPhone and iPhone OS 1 in 2007. The app allows the user to see weather conditions throughout the day, as well as a seven-day forecast. Locations can be added by pressing the list icon and the plus icon which allows the user to type in the city's name, ZIP Code or postal code or airport code. Weather also displays related metrics, such as the time of sunrise and sunset, humidity, chance of rain, visibility distance, and a UV index. The app is also capable of notifying users of any severe weather warnings issued by official sources.

Discontinued

Game Center 

Game Center was a standalone app released alongside iOS 4.1, which was merged into Settings with the release of iOS 10. Players can connect with friends, send friend requests, start playing games and organize online multiplayer games. The number of friends that can be connected to a single Game Center account is limited to 500. Some games may feature achievements, where for completing a certain task, the player is rewarded points. Depending on the game, a leaderboard may be present where a player can compare his or her score with friends or the world.

YouTube 

YouTube was an app that was introduced with the release of the iPhone in iPhone OS 1 which allowed users to find, search, and watch YouTube videos. The built-in YouTube app was removed with the release of iOS 6 in favor of Google (the owner of YouTube) releasing their own app.

References 

IOS
Apple Inc. software